Péter Bárándy (born 12 June 1949) is a Hungarian politician and jurist, who served as Minister of Justice between 2002 and 2004. He is a member of the Bárándy family, which is a famous lawyer dynasty in Hungary. He was a founding member and deputy chairman of the Republic Party in 1992 but the party never gain a seat until its abolishment (1996). After that Bárándy did not participate in Hungary's political life until 2002.

Péter Medgyessy appointed him justice minister on 27 May 2002. During his ministership Bárándy was one of the most popular politicians. As a result he was nominated to the position of President of Hungary, but he stepped back because only few MPs supported him.

References
 MTI Ki Kicsoda 2009, Magyar Távirati Iroda Zrt., Budapest, 2008, 70. old., ISSN 1787-288X
 Bárándy Péter életrajza saját honlapján
 A HVG interjúja Bárándy Péterrel

1949 births
Living people
Hungarian Socialist Party politicians
Justice ministers of Hungary